Briano is an Italian surname originating from Savona. Possible origins of the name include deriving from the medieval name “Brianus” and from the archaic Provençal “Brian”, meaning “Small” or “Maggot”. Notable people with the surname include:

Giacomo Briano (1589–1649), Polish Jesuit and architect
Louis Briano (1891–1966), Monegasque sport shooter
Mauro Briano (born 1975), Italian footballer

Italian-language surnames